Tragic Hero (Cantonese Yale: Ying hung ho hon) is a 1987 Hong Kong action-crime film directed by Taylor Wong, and starring Chow Yun-fat, Andy Lau, and Alex Man. The film is the sequel to Rich and Famous but was released first due to its appeal as an action film.

Summary

The movie begins in 1980.  Lee Ah-chai (Chow Yun-fat) has slowly become passive with his focus on family life.  Meanwhile, Yung (Alex Man) is now out of jail and is now a rising power within Chu Lo-tai's gang.  They run into each other at a gangster's funeral. Ah-chai shakes his hand and Yung reminisces sarcastically about how he was once taught a lesson by Ah-chai. (Ah-chai shot Yung in the hand, after Yung killed a friend of Chai's for money; this is addressed in the prologue of the movie, and shown in full in Rich and Famous.)

Yung's sister, Wai-chui (Pauline Wong) picks up their father, who is going to visit with his stepson Kwok (Andy Lau) in Malacca. Kwok is now married to a local woman and has adopted many children. His father tells Kwok that Ah-chai might be in danger of being killed by Yung.

Ah-chai meets with Chu Lo-tai (Ko Chun-hsiung), his previous rival, now his business partner. Ah-chai warns Chu Lo-tai that perhaps Yung is becoming too powerful. Chu Lo-tai acknowledges this threat and plots to have Yung assassinated. Chu Lo-tai and his gang meet for dinner and Chu confronts Yung angrily after another one of Yung's rude outbursts. Two of Chu's men draw their guns at Yung. Yung reaches for an oyster shell.  At that signal, most of Chu Lo-tai's gang turn against him and Yung stabs Chu Lo-tai to death with a broken bottle. Yung now leads Chu's gang.

Ah-chai's wife Po-yee (Carina Lau) goes to the mall with her son where she runs into Yung and his men. Yung flirts with Po-yee, who refuses his advances. He then orders his men to attack Number 6 (Shing Fui-On) and Chuan (Ng Hong-ming), who valiantly fight against 8 men and lose.

Ah-chai arranges to have a meeting with Yung at a club. The meeting goes badly for Chai as Yung takes opportunities to insult him, while he realizes their mutual police ally is not totally on his side against Yung. Yung provokes Ah-chai into splashing water into his face.

Later that evening, Ah-chai and his two lieutenants, Number 6 and Big Eye (Lam Chung) discuss what to do about Yung. They both note the need to take action and strike first. Ah-chai says that he will call a meeting with the other remaining gangs to wipe Yung out. Ah-chai is then interrupted and told that his son is ill and that he will need to take him to the hospital. His two lieutenants are disappointed that their boss has grown soft.

Yung is then unexpectedly visited by Kwok who begs for Yung not to kill Ah-chai.  Yung humiliates his step brother by forcing him to beg for forgiveness and serving him tea on one knee. Yung then stops the embarrassment and hugs Kwok, telling him that he will oblige as long as Ah-chai does not attempt anything first.

The following morning, Kwok is driven to the airport by his step sister Wai-chui and Kwok has Wai-chui swear to secrecy that no one knows that he has come to talk to Yung. She promises to. Kwok then jokes that Wai-chui is now almost 30 and still works for Ah-chai and that she should settle down. Wai-chui admits that she loves Ah-chai too much and cannot bear to leave his side. Kwok jokingly promises to keep that a secret but says that if she doesn't move on after 2 years that he's going to tell Ah-chai about it.

The scene switches back to Number 6 as he decides to take matters into his own hands. Big Eye tells him to be careful, while Number 6 notes that a fortune teller told him that he would live past 70. Number 6 puts on a bulletproof vest and proceeds with his plot to assassinate Yung. That afternoon, Number 6 masquerades as a window washer at an office building. He hangs outside an office where Yung is practicing putting golf balls. Yung pretends to ignore him. Yung's men then come into the room with flowers, and suddenly draw guns and shoot Number 6 many times.  Number 6 is badly wounded but then bursts through the window and almost kills Yung before his men shoot Number 6 multiple times in the neck and face. Yung taunts the dead Number 6 and is enraged. He is hell bent on killing Ah-chai and disregards his step brother's request.

Ah-chai receives the news that Number 6 is dead. He tells Wai-chui that it was due to Big Eye's betrayal, and he can hardly trust anyone besides her. Chai and Big Eye get in the car to go to the meeting with other gang leaders. The driver, Chuan, purposely causes a flat tire and they pull over. Ah-chai questions Big Eye about how Yung's men knew about Number 6's assassination plot. He says that Big Eye must've betrayed Number 6 to Yung since Number 6 is very tight lipped and he would only tell Ah-chai or Big Eye of his plans. Big Eye admits to his betrayal and Ah-chai shoots him in the arm. Big Eye explains that Ah-chai growing soft over the years has doomed them all and he was only trying to save himself from the same fate. Ah-chai realizes Big Eye is right and spares him. Big Eye attempts to get out of the car and is killed by the driver Chuan with a knife. Chai looks despondently at Big Eye sprawled against the window as he is sad to see his old friend die, but then is dismayed to realize, as Big Eye's body slumps down against the car, that Big Eye had pulled a gun and wanted to kill him even after Chai forgave Big Eye.

Ah-chai goes to his meeting, but he realizes they've been betrayed, their plans having been tampered with the Big Eye. The other gangsters have all brought illegal weapons and now they hear police sirens coming to raid them. They are completely trapped and one of fellow gang leaders attempts to run to the car to get Ah-chai out of there. The gang leader is wounded badly and Ah-chai gathers all their weapons. He walks out to surrender to the police, claiming all the guns are his, and demand the police to get an ambulance there for the wounded. Ah-chai is driven away in police custody. Yung drives by the police car and taunts Ah-chai that he no longer has any allies on either side of the law.

Ah-chai's wife Po-yee comes to the police station to visit Ah-chhai. Yung takes this opportunity and meets with her in one of the rooms. He then attempts to force himself onto her until she bites his lip and he backs off. He tells her that she was his woman and that he gave her to Ah-chai.

After Ah-chai gets out of custody, he arranges a meeting with his longtime police ally to find out how his meeting got busted. Wai-chui is suspicious and lurks about outside the window with a gun. The police ally notes that Ah-chai is a nobody now and that everybody wants to bring Ah-chai down. They argue, with Chai threatening to testify against the corrupt policeman in court. He handcuffs himself to the wall and uses a blade to cut himself. Having staged what looks like an attack, he then shoots Ah-chai. Wai-chui shoots the police ally and then jumps in to check on Ah-chai. The police ally shoots Wai-chui in the back of the head and kills her. Ah-chai, in a fit of rage, gets up and shoots the police ally to death, not before taking 2 more bullets himself. He then escapes out the window to a boat with the help of Chuan as the police coming pouring in to shoot at Ah-chai.

Ah-chai and his family escape to Malacca and visit Kwok. They reminisce about the past and he tells Kwok about Yung's actions. Ah-chai and Kwok seem content in Malacca until Yung decides he needs to finish the job. He sends assassins to Malacca to leave a bomb in the house. Kwok takes Ah-Chai away from the house to give him tickets for his return to Hong Kong. Kwok and Yung's father is lured away from the house to the airport. A bomb kills everyone inside, including Kwok's wife, his adopted children, and Ah-chai's family. Chai and Kwok are filled with anguish and swear revenge on Yung.

Yung is then called into the police station in regards to the killings. Inspector Cheung (Danny lee) tells Yung that he is the number one target of the police. He then receives a phone call from Chai and dismisses Yung. Ah-chai apologizes for the way that he treated Inspector Cheung in the past, having arranged for his demotion to a faraway post. He praises Cheung for his principles and notes that Yung's lawyers will protect him too well from the justice system. Chai says he has returned to Hong Kong to destroy Yung, intending to go down together with him. He asks Cheung to keep the police out of the way and to take his body away when he's done. Inspector Cheung agrees.

Meanwhile, Yung is celebrating now that he rules supreme. He has one of his lackeys keep tabs on his father in the event that Ah-chai and Kwok attempt revenge. His lackey reports that Yung's father has gone crazy, crying endlessly at his daughter's grave, sitting and mumbling for hours at the docks and has no contact with his step son, Kwok. Yung is anxious and asks whether his father has been seen cohorting with Ah-chai and Kwok. The lackey does not know. The father shows up and confronts Yung about whether he killed Ah-chai and Kwok's family in Malacca. Yung denies it and then lies to him that someone else did it. Another lackey then reports that Yung's father was seen in the same area as Ah-chai and Kwok.  Yung is enraged that his father has openly betrayed him and admits to the killings. His father attacks him and Yung tells his lackeys to beat his father. The lackeys hesitate but do so and throw him out of the house.

Yung's father gets in a waiting taxi. A lackey approaches the back of the car and is shot in the face. Ah-chai and Kwok jump out of the car and kill everybody in the vicinity. Chuan gets out and grabs a large of bag of heavy weaponry. They reach the mansion and it is quiet. Chuan goes out to inspect the pool area and is shot to death. A number of men show up and Ah-chai and Kwok are completely surrounded. They quickly pull out their heavy weaponry and blow up the mansion with grenades and rockets. They rush into the house and kill many of Yung's men. At one point, Ah-chai is wounded by Yung's right-hand man and they become trapped in the fire at the house. Yung kills his right-hand man for suggesting the idea of retreating. Yung has gone completely mad. He wounds Ah-chai more and has a gun pointed at his face. Kwok charges out and knocks Yung over. Yung attempts to shoot Ah-chai and Kwok takes the bullets and is seriously wounded. Again, Yung has Ah-chai at gunpoint and suddenly Yung's father appears and shoots Yung. Yung shoots his father down. Ah-chai gets up and beats up Yung to the point where Yung is now hanging onto the edge. Ah-chai taunts Yung and throws Yung into the fire below. Yung blows up due to all the ammunition he had strapped onto his vest.  Ah-chai falls down in exhaustion and Inspector Cheung shows up to save them. Chai tells Cheung that he alone killed all those people, and that Kwok and Kwok's father are innocent onlookers. Cheung says he will try to help Kwok at trial. Ah-chai and Kwok are carried out on stretchers as the movie ends.

Cast
Chow Yun-fat as Lee Ah-chai
Andy Lau as Lam Ting-kwok
Alex Man as Tang Kar-yung
Pauline Wong as Tang Wai-chiu
Carina Lau as Lau Po-yee
Danny Lee as Inspector Cheung
Shing Fui-On as Number 6
Ko Chun-hsiung as Chu Lo-tai
Alex Ng as Chuan
Lam Chung as Big Eye
Elvis Tsui as Yung's thug
Peter Yang as Uncle Chi
Yip San as wife
Angela Yu Chien as Mrs. Chu

References

External links
 IMDb listing
 

1987 films
1987 action thriller films
1980s crime thriller films
Hong Kong action thriller films
Hong Kong crime thriller films
Hong Kong sequel films
Gun fu films
Triad films
1980s Cantonese-language films
Films set in Hong Kong
Films shot in Hong Kong
Films directed by Taylor Wong
1980s Hong Kong films